The region of the Mali i Zi tribe (also known as Malziu) is located in the region of Kukës, in northeastern Albania. It is found on the left (south) side of the Drin River, along the old road of Shkodra - Prizren, close to ten kilometers to the west of the city of Kukës. Mali i Zi, despite its proximity with Kukës and Luma, is considered one of the seven Bajraks of Puka; it borders the traditional regions of the tribe of Thaçi in the north and northwest, with Has across the Drini to the northeast, with the River across the Black Drin to the east, and with Mirdita to the south and west. The main settlements of Mali i Zi are: Kalimashi, Kolshi, Kryemadhi, Shtana, Mëgulla, Shënmëria and Shikaj.

References

Notes

Sources 

Historical regions in Albania
Tribes of Albania
Albanian regions
Albanian ethnographic regions